Richard M. Post (born September 27, 1945) known as Dickie Post is a former college and professional American football player. A halfback, he played for the American Football League's San Diego Chargers and was the UPI choice for AFL Rookie of the Year in 1967. Post was known to be one of pro football's most elusive backs. In 2008, NFL films named him the ninth most elusive runner of all time. He finished in the top five of AFL rushers for three consecutive years (1967–1969) and won the AFL rushing crown in 1969.

Football career
He played his college football for the University of Houston Cougars.  He played professionally for the San Diego Chargers of the AFL from 1967 to 1969 and in their first season in the merged National Football League. During his San Diego stay, he played in 2 Pro Bowls (1967) and 1969. His last year in the NFL was 1971, which he started by playing for the Denver Broncos and ended playing for the Houston Oilers.

1945 births
Living people
Players of American football from Los Angeles
American football running backs
Houston Cougars football players
American Football League Rookies of the Year
American Football League rushing leaders
American Football League All-Star players
San Diego Chargers players
American Football League players